KSWV (810 AM) is a radio station broadcasting a Classic Hits format featuring music from the 1960s through the 1980s. Licensed to Santa Fe, New Mexico, United States, the station serves the Albuquerque area. The station is currently owned by Celina Gonzales, through licensee GCBendito 4 LLC.  Studios and transmitter are located in Santa Fe.

810 AM is a United States clear-channel frequency; KSWV must reduce power during nighttime hours in order to protect the skywave signals of the Class A stations, which are KGO in San Francisco, California and WGY in Schenectady, New York.

History
The station went on the air as KAFE in 1966; it later became KMIK on July 22, 1987.

In 1991, the KMIK was acquired by George Abrán Gonzales, who has served as the Mayor of Santa Fe from 1968 to 1972. Gonzalez changed the station's call sign to KSWV (Que Suave) on November 11, 1991. He operated the station with his four sons.

On February 17, 2016 a construction permit was granted by the FCC to move translator K294BS out of Hereford, Texas to Santa Fe, New Mexico to rebroadcast KSWV at 99.9 MHz giving the station a 250 watt FM signal. La Voz Broadcasting had purchased the translator from Educational Media Foundation in January 2016. A license for the translator at the new frequency and community of license as K260CT was issued on September 30, 2016.

Effective November 22, 2017, the licenses for KSWV and translator K260CT were transferred from La Voz Broadcasting to GCBendito 4 LLC; both entities are owned by Celina Gonzales.

In early 2019 the station changed formats from Spanish variety to classic hits.

References

External links

FCC History Cards for KSWV

Radio Locator Information for K260CT

Classic hits radio stations in the United States
Hispanic and Latino American culture in Albuquerque, New Mexico
Hispanic and Latino American culture in Santa Fe, New Mexico
SWV